Kirsten Joy Child (born 1986) is an English singer-songwriter who is best known for singing with the pop group Clean Bandit after coming to prominence after taking part in the 2012 inaugural series of the singing talent contest The Voice UK. Having been chosen by judge Jessie J in the programme's 'blind auditions' round, Kirsten joined other contestants on Jessie's team to compete for a place in the finals. During the 'battle rounds' Kirsten lost out to fellow contestant Toni Warne.

Early life
Kirsten Joy Child was born in 1986 and has enjoyed singing and performing from a young age. Kirsten's father, Grant, was born in South Africa, and mother, Phillipa, was born in Wimbledon. Kirsten was born in South Africa and has three siblings.

Music career
Music featured throughout Joy's school life through plays, assemblies local concerts, including in Rochester Cathedral, singing at church at taking part in local talent competitions. She was a contestant in a "Star4Medway", a local talent competition promoted by the Mayor of Medway. This led to the opportunity for Joy to sing one of her own songs opening on the main stage at the Kent Music Festival at Port Lympne in 2005, where acts included Girls Aloud and Lemar.

Before starting out as a session singer, Joy performed as a member of the ACM Gospel Choir in 2006 at the Academy of Contemporary Music (ACM), a music academy located in Guildford. Joy, Mark De-Lisser and other ACM students featured on the BBC's talent-themed television show Last Choir Standing in 2008. The ACM Gospel Choir reached the finals of the show.

An article for Kentonline reported that Kirsten had "shared a stage with Gary Barlow, supported Girls Aloud and has sung in front of the Queen". She has also worked with Producers.

She was a member of the United Kingdom national jury in the Eurovision Song Contest 2012.

In 2012, the UK version of The Voice was broadcast on BBC television and Joy took part as a solo contestant. She succeeded in the 'blind audition' round in attracting the attention of Jessie J and joined Jessie's team to compete against other teams for judges Tom Jones, Will.i.am and Danny O'Donoghue. At the 'battle round' stages, Joy was eliminated in favour of contestant Toni Warne.

The Voice UK performances and results

Music releases
Kirsten released her debut EP Written in the Sky in February 2013. It was produced by Ben Collier and Nari Man.

EP 'Written in the Sky', 2013

She attempted to represent Switzerland at the Eurovision Song Contest 2015 with the song "One Life". On 25 November 2014, it was revealed that Joy was not one of the nine acts selected by SRF to move on to the live auditions and was eliminated.

Clean Bandit
Since 2016, Joy has been a touring member of Clean Bandit. She also records backing vocals for many of the group's songs.

In 2018, it was announced that Joy would become a featuring artist on one of the band's new songs on their second studio album, "What is Love?", featuring on "We Were Just Kids" with Craig David.

References

External links

1986 births
Living people
English women singer-songwriters
The Voice (franchise) contestants
21st-century English women singers
21st-century English singers